From Hell to Hell is a 1997 Belarusian drama film about the Kielce pogrom directed by Dmitry Astrakhan. The film was selected as the Belarusian entry for the Best Foreign Language Film at the 69th Academy Awards, but was not accepted as a nominee.

Plot
In 1941, the Polish town Kielce is occupied by the Nazis. The main character, before being sent to a concentration camp, gives her daughter to a Polish family whose child has recently died. When the war has passed, the former prisoner returns to his hometown and wants his daughter returned, but she has grown up not knowing who her real parents were. Internal contradictions and deep spiritual experiences put the heroes in a cruel situation of choice.

Cast
 Valeria Valeeva as Fela
 Anja Kling as Helena Golde
 Gennadi Svir as Henryk Golde
 Alla Kliouka as Anna Sikorska
 Gennady Nazarov as Andrzej Sikorski
 Vladimir Kabalin as Bashnak

See also
 List of submissions to the 69th Academy Awards for Best Foreign Language Film
 List of Belarusian submissions for the Academy Award for Best Foreign Language Film

References

External links
 

1997 films
1997 drama films
1990s German-language films
1990s Russian-language films
Belarusian drama films
Yiddish-language films
Belarusfilm films
Holocaust films

Films set in 1941
Films directed by Dmitry Astrakhan